Zalesnaya is a rural locality (a village) and the administrative center of Krasnosludskoye Rural Settlement, Dobryansky District, Perm Krai, Russia. The population was 419 as of 2010. There are 34  streets.

Geography 
Zalesnaya is located 46 km south of Dobryanka (the district's administrative centre) by road. Kuligino is the nearest rural locality.

References 

Rural localities in Dobryansky District